In bluegrass and other music, the G run (G-run), or Flatt run (presumably after Lester Flatt), is a stereotypical ending used as a basis for improvisation on the guitar. It is the most popular run in bluegrass, the second being "Shave and a Haircut".

The best known version, above, is a slight elaboration of the simplest form, below.

See also
Banjo roll
Fill (music)

Sources

Bluegrass music
Riffs